Shimon Attie (born in Los Angeles in 1957) is an American visual artist. He was awarded a Guggenheim Fellowship in 2008, The Rome Prize in 2001 and a Visual Artist Fellowship from Harvard University's Radcliffe Institute for Advance Study in 2007.  His work spans a variety of media, including photography, site-specific installation, multiple channel immersive video installation, performance, and new media.  Much of Attie's practice explores how a wide range of contemporary media may be used to re-imagine new relationships between space, time, place, and identity.  Much of Attie's works in the 90s dealt with the history of World War II. He first garnered significant international attention by slide projecting images of past Jewish life onto contemporary locations in Berlin.  More recent projects have involved using a range of media to engage local communities to find new ways of representing their history, memory and potential futures.  Attie's artworks and interventions are site-specific and immersive in nature, and tend to engage subject matter that is both social, political and psychological. In 2013, five monographs have been published on Attie's work, which has also been the subject of a number of films aired on PBS, BBC, and ARD. Since receiving his MFA in 1991, Attie has realized approximately 25 major projects in ten countries around the world. Most recently, in 2013-14, Shimon Attie was awarded the Lee Krasner Lifetime Achievement Award in Art.

Life
Shimon Attie was born in 1957 and received an MFA in 1991. In 1991, he moved to Germany from his previous home in Northern California, and began to make work initially about Jewish identity and the history of the second World War.  His work later evolved to engage broader issues of memory, place and identity more generally. Attie moved to New York City in 1997.

Critical reaction

Shimon Attie's work has been extensively reviewed by a wide variety of publications, including features and/or reviews in The New York Times, The Washington Post, the Los Angeles Times, Art in America, ARTnews, Artforum, The Village Voice, The Boston Globe, and many others.

Samples include:

Yasaman Alipour, writing in "The Brooklyn Rail: Critical Perspectives on Arts, Politics, and Culture", on Attie's solo exhibition "Facts on the Ground" at Jack Shainman Gallery in New York City:

"Celebrated for his approach, which blurs the line between installation and photography, Attie has spent his career moving from one city to the next to explore the trauma and history of the marginalized and to reflect on social memory and the construction of Identity.  Seductive, daring, and clever, Facts on the Ground dives into the inherently charged and polarized politics of its subject matter. Attie achieves something profound: he presents a unique opportunity to contemplate Israel/Palestine without the distraction that is simultaneously a manifestation of the limitations of visual of written language and the possibilities of their alliance."  June 3, 2016

Holland Cotter, writing in The New York Times on one of Attie's works in the traveling exhibition "Art, AIDS, America":

"…Less familiar work makes the strongest impression, benefiting from the element of surprise.  A beautiful 1998 photograph by Shimon Attie of a life-size projection of a male's image on a bed, is one."   July 28, 2016

Norman Kleeblatt, writing in a cover story for Art in America on Attie's survey exhibition at the Institute of Contemporary Art, Boston:

"Like many other artists in the wake of Marcel Broodthaers, Attie is first and foremost an artist-anthropologist, a practitioner who digs into archives and then reconfigures his nonartistic source material into complicated art works." June 2000

Amei Wallach, writing a feature in a Sunday New York Times on Shimon Attie's public art installation, "Between Dreams and History", in Manhattan's Lower East Side:

"…like the best of evanescent public projects, from Christo and Jeanne-Claude's Wrapped Reichstag to Mr. Attie's "Writing on the Wall," this one will animate real anxieties in real time. Not to mention a sense of wonder."   Sept 13, 1998

Laura Hodes in Forward felt his 2012 show at Northwestern succeeded in creating a space that was at once dream like and a memorial to the dead, involving the viewer in the historical situation: "we become simultaneously the hidden Jew, the marching Nazi, the Dutch passersby, the voyeur and even the medium itself."

Exhibitions
Selected Solo Exhibitions include:

 2019 Madison Museum of Contemporary Art, Madison, WI;
2017 The Saint Louis Art Museum;
 2017 Kunstkraftwerk, Leipzig, Germany;
 2016 Jack Shainman Gallery, New York, NY;
 2016   National Museum of Wales, Cardiff, UK;
 2013   Wexner Center for the Arts, Columbus, Ohio;
 2012 Jack Shainman Gallery, New York, NY;
 2011 The Aldrich Contemporary Art Museum, CT;
 2008	   de Young Museum, San Francisco, CA;
 2006   Miami Art Museum, Miami, FL;
 2005 Numark Gallery, Washington, D.C.;
 2004	   Museum of Contemporary Photography, Chicago, IL;
 2002 Jack Shainman Gallery, New York, NY;
 2001 Gallery Paule Anglim, San Francisco, CA;
 2000 Galerie Claude Samuel, Paris, France;
 1999/00 The Institute of Contemporary Art (ICA), Boston, MA;
 1998 Jack Shainman Gallery, New York, NY;
 1996	   Cleveland Museum of Art, Cleveland, OH;
 1995	   Nicole Klagsbrun Gallery, New York, NY;
 1995	   Ruth Bloom Gallery, Los Angeles, California;
 1995   Museum of Contemporary Art, Oslo, Norway

Selected Group Exhibitions include:

 2016/7 The National Gallery of Art, Washington, D.C.;
 2013 Art Institute of Chicago; 
 2011 Kunst Museum Bonn; 
 1994/5, 2000-01 The Museum of Modern Art, NY; 
 2001, 2005, 2008, 2013 The Corcoran Gallery of Art, Washington, D.C.; 
 2007 Centre Georges Pompidou, Paris; 
 2003 San Francisco Museum of Modern Art, San Francisco, CA; 
 2001 Printemps de September a Toulouse

In public collections
His photographs Almstadtstrasse 43, Berlin (1930) (car parked in front of Hebrew bookstore) (1991) and Mulackstrasse 37, Berlin (1932) (children and tower) (1991) are owned by the Museum of Modern Art in New York.
Other collections include The National Gallery of Art in Washington, D.C., The Miami Art Museum, Centre Georges Pompidou in Paris, the Los Angeles County Museum of Art, San Francisco Museum of Modern Art, Berlinische Galerie, Berlin, and the Art Institute of Chicago, among many others.

References

Further reading
 Peter Muir, Shimon Attie's Writing on the Wall: History, Memory, Aesthetics, Ashgate, 2010.

External links
Shimon Attie's official website
Jack Shainman gallery
Guggenheim Fellow profile

1957 births
Living people
Jewish American artists
Artists from Los Angeles
American expatriates in Germany
21st-century American Jews